Frătăuții Noi is a commune located in Suceava County, Bukovina, northeastern Romania. It is composed of two villages, namely Costișa and Frătăuții Noi.

Late modern period history 

As it is the case of other rural settlements from the countryside of Suceava County, Frătăuții Noi (just like Frătăuții Vechi for example) was previously inhabited by a sizable German community, more specifically by Bukovina Germans during the late Modern Age up until the mid 20th century, starting as early as the Habsburg period and, later on, the Austro-Hungarian period.

Administration and local politics

Communal council 

The commune's current local council has the following political composition, according to the results of the 2020 Romanian local elections:

References 

Communes in Suceava County
Localities in Southern Bukovina